Aberdeen F.C. is a Scottish professional football club based in Aberdeen

Aberdeen F.C. may also refer to:
 Aberdeen F.C. (1881), a Scottish football club formed in 1881. On 14 April 1903 they merged with the two other Aberdeen clubs, Victoria United and Orion, to form the current Aberdeen F.C.
 Aberdeen F.C. Women, the women's division of the club founded separately in 2011 and merged with the Aberdeen FC organization in 2018

See also 
 Aberdeen (disambiguation)